Sebastian Kłosiński  (born 4 August 1992, in Warsaw) is a Polish speed skater.

Career
Kłosiński won the bronze medal in the Team sprint event at the 2018 European Speed Skating Championships in Kolomna together with Piotr Michalski and Artur Nogal.
He is trained by Tuppu Nieminen, a retired Finnish speed skater.

References

External links 
 

1992 births
Living people
Polish male speed skaters
Olympic speed skaters of Poland
Speed skaters at the 2018 Winter Olympics
Speed skaters from Warsaw